Montello Bridging Finance was a specialist real estate financier based in London, run by parent company Montello Capital Partners, which is also the asset manager for the Montello Income Fund, the Montello Development Finance Fund and the Montello Real Estate Opportunity Fund.

The Montello Income Fund is a real estate bridging finance fund that is focussed on lending against the residential property market in the United Kingdom (specifically in London). The Montello Development Finance Fund is a specialist development finance lending vehicle, which focusses on lending to residential developers in London.

Montello Bridging Finance funds its transactions through its own suite of funds (the Montello Income Fund and the Montello Development Finance Fund) and bank funding lines. The Montello Income Fund is set up as a UK dual exempt unit trust and limited partnership that is open to individual investors, offshore bonds, and Self-invested personal pension (SIPP) investors. The Fund lends directly to end borrowers in the UK, and takes first charge security interest for all of its loans in the name of the Fund.

As a bridge financing specialist, Montello provides short-term funding solutions for borrowers. Examples of where Montello provides bridging finance includes auction purchases, for corporate cash-flow issues, to complete under-market value purchases, or other instances where fast settlements are required.

Montello Capital Management has over a quarter of a billion dollars under management.

See also 
LendInvest

References

External links
Montello Bridging Finance website
Montello Income Fund website

Defunct companies based in London